Sophronica calceata is a species of beetle in the family Cerambycidae. It was described by Chevrolat in 1855.

References

Sophronica
Beetles described in 1855